Caxata is a small town in Bolivia. In 2001 it had an estimated population of 317.

References

Populated places in La Paz Department (Bolivia)